Ibe Zito Ogbonna  (born on 27 March 1983, in Sokoto, Nigeria) is a former Nigerian football player who lives in Ashdod, Israel.

Playing career
Zito played for Hapoel Tel Aviv from 2003 to 2007. During the four seasons he managed to keep his position as a 'king of goals' of the club.

After spending four seasons in Israel with Hapoel Tel Aviv, Ogbonna signed a three-year contract with CFR Cluj in Romania.

He only managed to play two games for the Romanians though, suffering an injury early in the season that kept him on the sideline for a year. Ogbonna was then released on a free by CFR Cluj.

He signed for South African Premier Soccer League club Kaizer Chiefs in November 2008. In January 2012 he is going to negotiations with FK Vardar. He signed with FK Vardar Skopje deal on 31 January.

He relocated to Israel in 2017.

Family
Married to Katia Ogbonna since 2016. The couple has two daughters.

Honours
Israel State Cup (2):
2006, 2007
Liga I (1):
2008
Cupa României (1):
2008
First Macedonian Football League (1):
2011–12

External links
  Profile and statistics of Ibezito Ogbonna on One.co.il
 Profile and statistics of Ibezito Ogbonna on NigerianPlayers.com
 Interview

1983 births
Living people
People from Sokoto
Igbo sportspeople
Nigerian footballers
Association football forwards
Rangers International F.C. players
Sharks F.C. players
Hapoel Tel Aviv F.C. players
Israeli Premier League players
Liga I players
CFR Cluj players
Kaizer Chiefs F.C. players
KF Apolonia Fier players
FC Atyrau players
FK Vardar players
Enyimba F.C. players
Nigerian expatriate footballers
Expatriate footballers in Israel
Nigerian expatriate sportspeople in Israel
Expatriate footballers in Romania
Nigerian expatriate sportspeople in Romania
Expatriate soccer players in South Africa
Nigerian expatriate sportspeople in South Africa
Expatriate footballers in Albania
Nigerian expatriate sportspeople in Albania
Expatriate footballers in Kazakhstan
Nigerian expatriate sportspeople in Kazakhstan
Expatriate footballers in North Macedonia
Nigerian expatriate sportspeople in North Macedonia